Haramsøya is an island in Ålesund Municipality in Møre og Romsdal county, Norway. The village of Austnes is located on the southeast part of the island, and that is the location of Haram Church. The Ulla lighthouse is located on the north end of the island. The population (2015) of the island is 571.

The island is connected to the mainland via a car ferry to the mainland and to the neighboring island of Lepsøya. The Ullasund Bridge connects the island to the other neighboring island of Flemsøya to the north. The Nordøyvegen bridge and tunnel project connects the island of Haramsøya to the mainland and its neighboring islands, having been completed in 2022.

See also
List of islands of Norway

References

Ålesund
Islands of Møre og Romsdal